Eupithecia picturata is a moth in the  family Geometridae. It is found in Kenya and South Africa.

References

Moths described in 1902
picturata
Moths of Africa